
Gmina Kutno is a rural gmina (administrative district) in Kutno County, Łódź Voivodeship, in central Poland. Its seat is the town of Kutno, although the town is not part of the territory of the gmina.

Villages
Gmina Kutno contains the villages and settlements of Adamów, Adamowice, Bielawki, Boża Wola, Byszew, Byszew-Kaczyn, Dębina, Dudki, Florek, Franki Wroczyńskie, Głogowiec, Gnojno, Grabków, Julinki, Kalinowa, Kolonia Sójki, Kolonia Strzegocin, Komadzyn, Kotliska, Krzesin, Krzesin-Parcel, Krzesinówek, Kuczków, Leszczynek, Leszno, Malina, Marianki, Michałów, Nagodów, Nowa Wieś, Nowe Sójki, Nowy Gołębiew, Nowy Gołębiewek, Obidówek, Piwki, Podczachy, Raciborów, Ryków, Sieciechów, Siemiennik, Sieraków, Stanisławów, Stara Wieś, Stary Gołębiew, Stary Gołębiewek, Strzegocin, Wierzbie, Włosków, Woźniaków, Wroczyny, Wysoka Duża, Wysoka Wielka and Żurawieniec.

Neighbouring gminas
Gmina Kutno is bordered by the town of Kutno and by the gminas of Daszyna, Krośniewice, Krzyżanów, Łanięta, Nowe Ostrowy, Oporów, Strzelce and Witonia.

References
Polish official population figures 2006

Kutno
Kutno County